Mumeng is a dialect chain of the Austronesian family in Morobe Province, Papua New Guinea. Dambi–Kumalu and Patep–Zenag–Gorakor have a degree of mutual intelligibility. Kapin may belong as well.

References

Definitely endangered languages
South Huon Gulf languages
Languages of Morobe Province